Ludowy Klub Sportowy Dąb Barcin was a football club located in Barcin, Poland. It was found in 1963, and dissolved after the 2017–18 Klasa A season.

References

External links
 Dąb's profile at 90minut.pl

Association football clubs established in 1963
1963 establishments in Poland
2018 disestablishments in Poland
Żnin County
Football clubs in Kuyavian-Pomeranian Voivodeship